List of UTC timing centers is a list of over 70 recognized maintainers of atomic clocks around the world from which UTC is calculated. Below are links to some of the more notable time centers which contribute to the calculation of UTC. UTC is calculated by the International Bureau of Weights and Measures (BIPM) using weighted averages of the various times as reported by these 70+ listed timing centers.

When available, links are provided to the relevant "Time Page" displaying the current time as shown from the given service. Apparent times may vary due to variations in internet transmission times from various locations.

Canada: National Research Council
France: Systemes de Reference Temps Espace, Time Page
Netherlands: VSL, Time page
United Kingdom: National Physical Laboratory
United States: National Institute of Standards and Technology, Time Page
; https://www.usno.navy.mil/USNO/time

See also 
 Coordinated Universal Time
 Time

References 

Timekeeping